Lucas "Luke" Fafara II (born January 3, 1945), also known as Tiger Fafara, is a former American child actor best known for portraying the role of "Tooey Brown" on the sitcom Leave It to Beaver.

Career
Born in San Francisco, California, Fafara is the older brother of Stanley Fafara. Both boys were raised in Studio City, Los Angeles and began acting in film and television in the mid-1950s. Both were hired to appear on Leave It to Beaver after their mother took them to an open casting call. "Tiger" Fafara was cast as "Tooey Brown," a friend of Wally Cleaver while Stanley was cast as Beaver Cleaver's friend Hubert "Whitey" Whitney.

Besides appearing on Leave It to Beaver, Fafara appeared in episodes of various television series including Schlitz Playhouse of Stars, Private Secretary, Lassie, The Adventures of Rin Tin Tin, Make Room for Daddy, The Donna Reed Show, Wagon Train, and My Three Sons. He also had minor roles in the 1955 drama Good Morning, Miss Dove (Fafara and his brother Stanley portrayed the role of the same character as a child) and the 1957 melodrama All Mine to Give. Fafara left Leave It to Beaver in 1960 and stopped acting professionally in 1961.

Fafara returned to acting in 1983 with an appearance as the adult Tooey Brown in the television reunion film Still the Beaver. He reprised the role in the follow-up sitcom The New Leave It to Beaver, from 1983 to 1987.

Personal life
He is the father of Dez Fafara, the vocalist of heavy metal bands DevilDriver and Coal Chamber.

Filmography

References

External links

 

1945 births
20th-century American male actors
American male child actors
American male film actors
American male television actors
Living people
Male actors from San Francisco
Male Western (genre) film actors
People from Studio City, Los Angeles